Carla Hernández (born February 18, 1987) is a Mexican actress. She attended TV Azteca's acting class, Centro de Formación Actoral. She made her official acting debut in Azteca's Vidas Robadas, as Luz and Camila, the protagonist and antagonist, alongside Christian Bach and Andrés Palacios, in 2010.

Personal life
Hernández is the youngest of three siblings. She has an elder half-sister. When she was 10, she lost her brother, Mario Alberto, who was 16, after a car accident. At the age of 19, she gave birth to her son, Carlos, who lives in Guadalajara with her parents. As of March, 2013, she was pregnant again, apparently by Héctor Arredondo, who died in 2014.

Filmography

References

1987 births
Living people
Mexican telenovela actresses
Mexican television actresses
21st-century Mexican actresses
Actresses from Guadalajara, Jalisco
People educated at Centro de Estudios y Formación Actoral